The 1959 UC Davis Aggies football team represented the University of California, Davis as a member of the Far Western Conference (FWC) during the 1959 NCAA College Division football season. Led by fourth-year head coach Will Lotter—who returned for his third stint after leading the team in 1954, 1956, and 1957—the Aggies compiled an overall record of 1–8 with a mark of 0–5 in conference play, placing last out of six teams in the FWC. The team was outscored by its opponents 197 to 64 for the season. The Aggies played home games at Aggie Field in Davis, California.

The UC Davis sports teams were commonly called the "Cal Aggies" from 1924 until the mid 1970s.

Schedule

Notes

References

UC Davis
UC Davis Aggies football seasons
UC Davis Aggies football